Abbott's starling (Arizelopsar femoralis) is a species of starling in the family Sturnidae. It is found in Kenya and Tanzania. Its natural habitat is subtropical or tropical moist montane forests. It is threatened by habitat loss, and its population is estimated at 2500–9999. It is monotypic in the genus Arizelopsar.

The name of the species commemorates William Louis Abbott (1860-1936), American naturalist and collector, who studied the wildlife of the Indo-Malayan region.

Diet 
The Abbott's starling feeds on insects and fruit, including the fruit of Cornus volkensii.

Description 
The Abbott's starling has a black head and breast with white underparts and a yellow eye. Its voice is a musical whistled call moving up and down the scale.

References

Sturnidae
Birds of East Africa
Birds described in 1897
Taxa named by Charles Wallace Richmond
Taxonomy articles created by Polbot